Kimmarie Johnson (born Kim Marie Johnson; April 8, 1976) is an American actress, model, businesswoman, and beauty pageant titleholder. She is the founder of SkinGlow by Kimmarie, a skin care and beauty retailing and consulting company she founded in 2011. 

Earlier in her career, Johnson participated in and won the Miss Pennsylvania USA beauty pageant. She went on to represent the state of Pennsylvania in the Miss USA pageant.

Early life and education
Kimmarie Johnson was born April 8, 1976, in Pittsburgh, the youngest child of Edward Frank Johnson and Caroline Ella Johnson. She was raised in Wilkinsburg, Pennsylvania, where she attended Wilkinsburg High School. In her senior year at Wilkinsburg High, she enrolled in and successfully completed the Youth Competencies Program, a program sponsored by the Allegheny County Department of Federal Programs. Johnson was named Homecoming Queen in high school and then, later, also in college. 

Until age ten, Johnson lived with both of her parents; her parents separated when she was about ten years old after which she, her two brothers, and her mother lived with her grandmother, Eleanor Elizabeth Taliaferro West, and then with various family members. 

At age sixteen, she became a surrogate mother for her oldest brother's infant daughter, Rhonda Deneen Johnson. 

Johnson went on to study elementary education and child psychology at California University of Pennsylvania after which she moved to New York City. Johnson's oldest brother died in 2003, seven days before the birth of her son, Cameron Nino. In 2004, four months after oldest brother's death, Johnson's mother died from cancer.

Career

After college, Johnson worked as a flight attendant on international routes. While working with the airline, she was signed by Docherty, a Pittsburgh-based modelling agency. She was offered roles as a model for Vidal Sassoon, Oscar de la Renta, and United Colors of Benetton. In 1992, without any prior pageantry training, background, or experience, Johnson competed in and won the Miss Pennsylvania USA beauty pageant. She went on to represent the state of Pennsylvania in the 1993 Miss USA beauty pageant. She finished in the top 5 with higher scores than the 1993 winner and was the judges’ favorite to win the pageant. Johnson did not answer the question in the finals.

In 1996, Johnson moved to Los Angeles and continued modeling for the LA California Mart, and Lady Footlocker. While in Los Angeles, she began a career in acting. She booked her first acting role in the movie Dude, Where's My Car?. Johnson immediately started learning her craft as an actor, studying under Janet Alhanti in the studio of Margie Habor. She soon discovered that she also had a passion for dancing and enrolled in several dance studios to improve her skills. Johnson appeared in several episodes of the TV series Beverly Hills 90210 and Wanda at Large. She also appeared in the film the Diary of a Tired Black Man.

After the birth of her son in 2003, Johnson took a break from her career for a few years. While on hiatus, she studied at The Groundlings. In 2006, Johnson was voted Actress of the Month by the Independent Filmmakers Alliance From 2007 to 2010, she played several lead roles at various theatres, including The Next Stage, The Dark Side of The Moon, and The Puppet Show, and appeared in an adaptation of A Christmas Carol.

Film production
Johnson was executive producer for The Last Eve directed by Korean American director Young Man Kang. This film won several awards in film festivals including Best Action Feature Film Award in the New York International Independent Film and Video Festival and Best Cinematography in the New York B Movie Film Festival.

Entrepreneur
In 2011, Johnson teamed up with several skin care and beauty industry leaders and started SkinGlow by Kimmarie, a skin care and beauty line of products. In September 2012, she launched her first product, Ori Shea Butter, a 100% all natural extract from the Shea nut tree.

Filmography

Actress

Producer
2005, The Last Eve, executive producer
2010, Kimchi Warrior, executive producer

Acting
2004, Korean Report: Young Man Kang Goes to Hollywood (TV documentary) (playing herself)

References

External links

West Coast showbiz folk fondly recall Pittsburgh roots, By Christopher Rawson, Pittsburgh Post-Gazette.
The Dark Side of The Moon Stage Play, January 17, 2010 Stage play at The Next Stage, Hollywood, CA.
Jeff Allender's House of Checklists List of Ms USA Finalists.
KIMMARIE JOHNSON at Sue Wong "My Fair Lady" 2011 Fashion Event Arrivals, Sue Wong Collection (Video).
Legacy Cast, Lunatopia Productions Cast of Legacy.
13th Annual Women In Film Malibu Golf Classic - July 9, 2010 - Source: Frederick M. Brown/Getty Images North America.
Miss USA 1993- Announcement of the Top 6 Miss USA Finals (Video).
SkinGlow by Kimmarie Corporate Bio SkinGlow by Kimmarie Executive Bio.

African-American actresses
Actresses from Pittsburgh
African-American female models
Female models from Pittsburgh
African-American models
American beauty pageant contestants
California University of Pennsylvania alumni
1967 births
Living people
People from Wilkinsburg, Pennsylvania
21st-century African-American people
21st-century African-American women
20th-century African-American people
20th-century African-American women